The Tawagalawa letter (CTH 181) is a fragmentary Hittite text from the mid 13th century BC. It is notable for providing a window into relations between Hittites and Greeks during the Late Bronze Age and for its mention of a prior disagreement concerning a city called Wilusa, generally identified with the archaeological site of Troy.

Contents 

The Tawagalawa letter was written by a Hittite king to a king of Ahhiyawa around 1250 BC. The author is generally identified as Hattusili III, though some scholars have argued that it was written by Muwatalli II. Since the surviving text is fragmentary, the identities of the author and addressee are not known for certain, and nothing can be inferred about the identity of its addressee.

In the letter, the Hittite king seeks cooperation from the Ahhiyawan king in suppressing anti-Hittite activity in Western Anatolia. His particular concern was the activity of a warlord named Piyamaradu who had recently fled to Ahhiyawa-controlled territory after leading an unsuccessful rebellion in Lukka. Given Piyamaradu's apparent propensity for anti-Hittite activity, the author was concerned about his next moves and offered the Ahhiyawan king three proposals-- either extradite him to the Hittites, expel him from Ahhiyawa, or offer asylum on the condition that he not attempt any further rebellions. No surviving documents attest to the Ahhiyawan king's decision, though the subsequent decades saw an increase in Ahhiyawa control over Western Anatolia, suggesting that the appeal was rejected.

The letter is notable in part for the tone adopted by the Hittite king. Though he scolds his Ahhiyawan counterpart for previously supporting Piyamaradu, the letter is respectful and conciliatory, and uses terms of address such as "my brother" normally reserved for rulers of major empires such as Egypt and Babylonia. Thus, the letter has been taken as evidence that the Ahhiyawa were seen as a growing power in the region.

Scholarship  

The letter gets its conventional name from a brief mention of the Ahhiyawan king's brother Tawagalawa, a form that has been suggested to correspond to the Greek name Eteocles (Etewoklewes). Early studies erroneously assumed that the beginning of the letter concerned the activities of Tawagalawa. After reconsideration by Itamar Singer and Suzanne Heinhold-Krahmer in 1983, that part of the text was reinterpreted as referring to Piyamaradu and most scholars relegated Tawagalawa to a minor role in the letter. There are technical difficulties, however, with accepting Piyamaradu as the man who asked to become the Hittite king's vassal.

Piyamaradu is also mentioned in the Manapa-Tarhunta letter (c. 1295 BC) and, in the past tense, in the Milawata letter (c. 1240 BC). The Tawagalawa letter further mentions Miletus (as Millawanda) and its dependent city Atriya, as does the Milawata letter; and its governor Atpa, as does the Manapa-Tarhunta letter (although that letter does not state Atpa's fiefdom).

Trojan Connection  

In the letter, the Hittite king refers to former hostilities between the Hittites and the Ahhiyawans over Wilusa, which had now been resolved amicably:
"Oh, my brother, write to him this one thing, if nothing else: '...the king of Hatti has persuaded me about the matter of the land of Wilusa concerning which he and I were hostile to one another, and we have made peace'"

As most scholars identify Wilusa with Troy, this reference has been said to provide "a striking background for Homeric scholars researching the origin of the tradition of the Achaean attack on Ilios." However, the verb used (ku-ru-ri-iḫ-ḫu-e-en) could indicate an exchange of strongly worded cuneiform tablets, a full-on war, or anything in between.

See also
 Milawata letter
 Manapa-Tarhunta letter

Notes

References
S. Heinhold-Krahmer, StBoT 45, 2001, 192.
F. Starke, StBoT 31, 1990, 127, 377.
I. Singer, Anatolian Studies 33, 1983, 211
H.G. Guterbock, Orientalia, Nova Series, 59, 1990, 157–165

13th-century BC literature
Hittite texts
Assuwa league
Archaeological sources on Greek mythology
Priam